Pterostylis areolata is a species of orchid endemic to New Zealand. As with similar greenhoods, the flowering plants differ from those which are not flowering. The non-flowering plants have a rosette of leaves flat on the ground but the flowering plants have a single flower with leaves on the flowering spike. This greenhood has green and translucent white-striped flowers similar to those of P. australis but the stem leaves are shorter and never higher than the flowers.

Description
Flowering plants usually have a single pale green flower with translucent white stripes, sometimes with orange-coloured tips. The dorsal sepal and petals are fused, forming a hood or "galea" over the column with the dorsal sepal having a short point on its end. The lateral sepals spread apart from each other and turn towards the back of the galea. The labellum is red becoming darker near the tip. Flowering occurs from October to December.

Taxonomy and naming
Pterostylis areolata was first formally described in 1968 by Donald Petrie and the description was published in Transactions and Proceedings of the New Zealand Institute from a specimen collected near the Awatere River. The specific epithet (areolata) is a Latin word meaning "with small spaces".

Distribution and habitat
This greenhood grows in tussock grassland and scrub, near wetlands and in open forest. It occurs on both main islands of New Zealand, in a few places on the North Island but is widespread, especially on the eastern side of the South Island.

References

areolata
Endemic orchids of Australia
Orchids of New Zealand
Plants described in 1949